GEO Television may refer to:

Geo Television (Germany), a German-language pay-TV station of the RTL Group established in May 2014
Geo TV, a Pakistani television channel established in May 2002
Geo Entertainment
Geo Kahani, an entertainment channel of GEO network, broadcasting in Urdu language
Geo News
Geo Super
Geo Tez